Chorinea licursis is a species of butterfly belonging to the family Riodinidae.

Description
These butterflies are quite variable with respect to the size of the transparent region and of spots on the hindwings. They have transparent wings outlined with black and long tails on the hindwings. Forewings and hindwings are crossed by black veins and by two black transverse bands. At the base of the hindwing tails there are bright red marks. Adults are usually found from March to June. Larvae feed on Celastraceae (mainly Maytenus ilicifolia and Prionostemma species).

Distribution and habitat

References

External links
 Butterflies of America
 Borboletas e mariposas
 The Titian Peale Butterfly and Moth Collection

Butterflies described in 1775
Riodinini
Riodinidae of South America
Taxa named by Johan Christian Fabricius